The Union of Postal Communications Employees is a Canadian public employee labour union.

On March 1, 1967, the Post Office Component, whose origin goes back to the convention meeting of the Railway Mail Clerks in Ottawa in November 1966, joined the Public Service Alliance of Canada. This makes the component and the PSAC the successors to the Canadian Railway Mail Clerks Federation founded in 1889 and the oldest union at Canada Post.

At the Postal Communications Component convention in Halifax in August 1975, the delegates voted unanimously to change the name of their component to the Union of Postal Communications Employees (UPCE).

UPCE has members in 2 different bargaining units. The largest of these is the Canada Post group with approximately 2,600 members. UPCE members at Canada Post are employed mainly in an administrative, clerical, technical and/or professional capacity.

The other bargaining unit is situated in British Columbia and these approximately 120 members are employed by Purolator Courier Ltd. The Purolator bargaining unit members perform clerical and administrative duties. They are also retail representatives in the Purolator retail stores in B.C.

The UPCE, as do the other Components of the PSAC, holds a national convention every three years at which time delegates from all the Locals establish the budget and policy of the Union and elect the National Executive.

References

Canadian Labour Congress
Public Services International
UNI Global Union
Organizations based in Ottawa
Trade unions in Canada
Postal trade unions
Trade unions established in 1966
1966 establishments in Ontario
Public Service Alliance of Canada